Each team's roster consisted of at least 15 skaters (forwards and defencemen) and two goaltenders, and at most 22 skaters and three goaltenders. All 16 participating nations, through the confirmation of their respective national associations, had to submit a roster by the first IIHF directorate meeting.

Age and team as of 10 May 2019.

Group A

Canada
The roster was announced on 29 April 2019.

Head coach: Alain Vigneault

Denmark
The roster was announced on 29 April 2019.

Head coach: Heinz Ehlers

Finland
A 28-player roster was announced on 27 April 2019. The final roster was revealed on 5 May 2019.

Head coach: Jukka Jalonen

France
The roster was announced on 29 April 2019.

Head coach: Philippe Bozon

Germany
A 27-player roster was announced on 30 April 2019. The final roster was revealed on 8 May 2019.

Head coach: Toni Söderholm

Great Britain
The roster was announced on 22 April 2019.

Head coach: Peter Russell

Slovakia
A 28-player roster was announced on 3 May 2019. The final roster was revealed on 8 May 2019.

Head coach: Craig Ramsay

United States
A 23-player roster was announced on 1 May 2019.

Head coach: Jeff Blashill

Group B

Austria
A 29-player roster was announced on 29 April 2019. The roster was cut down to 26 on 6 May 2019.

Head coach: Roger Bader

Czech Republic
A 36-player roster was announced on 28 April 2019. The final roster was revealed on 5 May 2019.

Head coach: Miloš Říha

Italy
The roster was announced on 1 May 2019.

Head coach: Clayton Beddoes

Latvia
A 26-player roster was announced on 30 April 2019.

Head coach: Bob Hartley

Norway
The roster was announced on 2 May 2019.

Head coach: Petter Thoresen

Russia
A 30-player roster was announced on 29 April 2019. The roster was cut down to 27 on 8 May 2019.

Head coach: Ilya Vorobiev

Sweden
A 18-player roster was announced on 30 April 2019. The final roster was revealed on 6 May 2019.

Head coach: Rikard Grönborg

Switzerland
A 29-player roster was announced on 28 April 2019. The final roster was revealed on 4 May 2019.

Head coach: Patrick Fischer

References

Rosters
IIHF World Championship rosters